Aeoliscus strigatus, also known as the razorfish, jointed razorfish or coral shrimpfish, is a member of the family Centriscidae of the order Syngnathiformes. This unique fish adopts a head-down tail-up position as an adaptation for hiding among sea urchin spines. The razorfish is found in coastal waters in the Indo-West Pacific. Its natural habitat includes beds of sea grass and coral reefs, where sea urchins are found.

Description

The razorfish is easily identifiable due to its particular body shape as well as its way of moving in synchrone group head down. Its fins are considerably reduced and transparent. The dorsal surface of the razorfish is covered by protective bony plates. They extend past the end of the body and over the tail fin, which terminates in a sharp spine. A black to brown median band runs the length of the fish crossing also the eyes. The color of the body is variable with the habitat. In seagrass environment, the background color of the body can be greenish-yellow with light brown stripes. In open areas like sand patch, rubble or close to coral reef, then the body coloration occurs to be light silver with a black to brown stripe. There is no known sexual dimorphism.

Ecology 
The razorfish eats mainly small brine shrimp and other small invertebrates. They have also been known to eat minute crustaceans. In the wild they have been observed hiding in the spines of sea urchins, both as a defense mechanism and as a hunting mechanism. When threatened by larger fish, the razorfish darts away to a nearby sea urchin or staghorn coral for protection. Razorfish hunt among sea urchin spines, especially those of the genus Diadema, and wait for small invertebrates that feed on the urchins. When their prey gets close, the razorfish will dart out and try to catch its dinner.

This species is oviparous and the eggs and larvae are pelagic, the juveniles settle when they attain  in length, frequently choosing to live among the spines of Diadema sea urchins.

References

External links
 

Centriscidae
Taxa named by Albert Günther
Fish described in 1861